Honest to Goodness is the debut album by Southern rock band Grinderswitch, released in 1974. The album contains contributions from Dickey Betts and Jaimoe of The Allman Brothers Band.

Critical reception
Billboard wrote that the band "sound like a less virtuoso Marshall Tucker Band."

Track listing
All songs written by Dru Lombar except where noted:

"Kiss the Blues Goodbye" - 4:55
"Can't Keep a Good Man Down" (D. Lombar, J.D. Petty, L. Howard, R. Burnett) - 3:54
"How the West Was Won" (L. Howard) - 5:22
"Eighty Miles to Memphis" (J.D. Petty) - 3:00
"Catch a Train" - 4:44
"Roll On Gambler" - 5:15
"Homebound" - 6:45
"Peach County Jamboree" - 3:48
"You're So Fine" (Live Version) - 3:29 (1994 CD Reissue)

Personnel

Band members

Dru Lombar - lead and slide guitars, lead vocals
Larry Howard - electric and acoustic guitars
Joe Dan Petty - bass, backing vocals
Rick Burnett - drums, congas, percussion

Additional musicians

Paul Hornsby - piano and organ
Richard Betts - Guitar on "Kiss the Blues Goodbye"
Jaimoe - Congas on "Can't Keep a Good Man Down" and "How the West Was Won"

Production

Design, Art Direction - Richard Mantel
Engineer - O.V. Sparks
Asst. Engineer - Tony Humphreys
Mastered by Bob Ludwig
Photography by Al Clayton
Producer - Paul Hornsby
Tape Asst. - Carolyn Harriss, Richard Schoff

References

1974 albums
Grinderswitch albums